Lorenzo Delgado (born 10 August 1916) is a Mexican boxer that competed in the 1936 Summer Olympics held in Berlin, Germany.

Amateur career
Delgado was selected into the four-member boxing team that represented Mexico in the 1936 Summer Olympics, and he trained under former medalist Francisco Cabañas at the YMCA Gymnasium in Mexico City. They left for Veracruz with the Olympic delegation on 29 June 1936, traveled to Hamburg by ship, and finally arrived by train to the German capital city.

His participation in the Olympic games, however, was short-lived. On 10 August 1936,  Delgado was eliminated in the first round of the lightweight class after losing his fight to Erik Ågren, the upcoming bronze medalist from Sweden.

Professional career

He debuted professionally on 20 March 1937 at Arena Jalisco, in Guadalajara. In his first bout, Delgado drew  after ten rounds with fellow Mexican Frankie Zavalza. He won the next match against Isidro Muñoz in the same city, but ended up losing the next three bouts held in Mexico City; first against Carlos Miranda and Jorge Morelia at Arena México, and finally against Luis Argüelles at Arena Coliseo.

References

External links
 

1916 births
Possibly living people
Mexican male boxers
Lightweight boxers
Olympic boxers of Mexico
Boxers at the 1936 Summer Olympics
20th-century Mexican people